Acadiocaris is an extinct genus of malacostracan crustacean that existed in Canada during the Upper Jurassic period. It was first named by Brooks in 1962, and contains the species Acadiocaris novascotica, named by Copeland in 1957 for the Canadian province of Nova Scotia. The genus Acadiocaris and its sister genera, Anthracocaris and Ophthalmapseudes, are placed in the family Acadiocarididae in order Tanaidacea. The family was originally considered a Spelaeogriphacean.

References

External links

Prehistoric Malacostraca
Jurassic crustaceans
Prehistoric crustacean genera
Monotypic crustacean genera
Fossils of Canada
Paleontology in Nova Scotia